Hafellia is a genus of lichenized fungi in the family Caliciaceae. The genus has a widespread distribution, especially in tropical regions, and contains five species. The genus is named in honour of Austrian lichenologist Josef Hafellner.

References

Teloschistales
Lichen genera
Taxa named by Klaus Kalb
Taxa described in 1986